Hubert Persson (22 February 1918 – 27 December 1990) was a Swedish wrestler. He competed in the men's Greco-Roman bantamweight at the 1952 Summer Olympics.

References

External links
 

1918 births
1990 deaths
Swedish male sport wrestlers
Olympic wrestlers of Sweden
Wrestlers at the 1952 Summer Olympics
Sportspeople from Västernorrland County
20th-century Swedish people